Jonathan Edwards (born March 28, 1972 in Boston, Massachusetts) is an American luger who competed in the early 1990s. He finished fourth in the men's doubles event at the 1994 Winter Olympics in Lillehammer.

Prior to his luge career, Edwards was a high school All-American in the sport of field lacrosse as a goalie and was recruited by a number of Universities in Division 1 NCAA to play lacrosse.

In 2018 he published his first book: An Athlete's Guide To Winning In Sports and Life

He has been a successful retailer, and runs a number of niche websites.  Currently he is professional speaker and coach.

Edwards today lives between Calgary, Alberta Canada and the Boston, Massachusetts area. References
1994 luge men's doubles results
Canadian Luge Association Board of Directors featuring Edwards
His professional speaking website is 
He mentors elite athletes through his website at AthleteSpecific.com

External links
 

1972 births
American male lugers
Canadian male lugers
Living people
Lugers at the 1994 Winter Olympics
Lugers from Calgary
Sportspeople from Boston
Olympic lugers of the United States